Defending champion Kimberley Zimmermann and her partner Anna Bondár defeated Amina Anshba and Panna Udvardy in the final, 6–3, 6–2 to win the doubles tennis title at the 2022 Internazionali Femminili di Palermo.

Erin Routliffe and Zimmermann were the reigning champions, buy Routliffe did not participate.

Seeds

Draw

Draw

References
Main draw

Internazionali Femminili di Palermo - Doubles
2022 Doubles